Gloria Garayua (born October 18, 1978) is an American actress. Garayua made her major film debut in the 2005 comedy film Fun With Dick and Jane, and is now commonly cast in guest roles on long-running series such as Six Feet Under, Weeds and The Shield. After being cast in an ongoing role in Grey's Anatomy, Garayua has played recurring roles in other popular TV shows such as Cougar Town and How to Get Away with Murder.

Early life and education
Gloria Garayua was born and raised in the Fordham section of the Bronx. Garayua is of Puerto Rican heritage and her parents are from Ponce, Puerto Rico. She attended St. Nicholas of Tolentine Elementary School and St. Catharine Academy High School, both in the Bronx.

Garayua graduated from Long Island University, Post with a Bachelor's Degree in acting, graduating summa cum laude. Her portrayal of Ariel in The Tempest earned her an Irene Ryan Nomination, where she placed as the 1st National Alternate. She joined Hermandad de Sigma Iota Alpha, Inc. at the Xi chapter.

Acting career
Garayua moved to California in 2004 after being cast in the leading role in Nilo Cruz's Two Sisters and A Piano at the Old Globe Theater in San Diego. Afterwards, she moved to the greater Los Angeles area and was cast for a minor role in Fun With Dick and Jane after only 2 weeks. During this time she also appeared in an episode of NYPD Blue as a guest star.

In 2007, Garayua guest starred in an episode of Grey's Anatomy as an Intern named Graciella. She would ultimately become a recurring guest star in the show, appearing in a total of 24 episodes from 2007 to 2010. In 2008 she played the part of Reyna in two episodes of Showtime's Weeds titled No Man is Pudding and The Three Coolers.

Other notable roles include Nurse Chapel in American Housewife, Madison Young in Criminal Minds, Vita Chacon in Cold Case, and Gloria Ortiz in ER. As of 2020, Garayua has worked in over 35 different television shows.

Garayua is also a prolific stage actress that has been featured in productions such as La Posada Magica (The Magic Journey) at South Coast Repertory, Real Women Have Curves at CASA 0101, The Skriker at the Kennedy Center Stage and Romeo and Juliet at the Bloomsburg Theatre Ensemble.

Awards
Garayua was nominated for Best Female Principal Performer by the San Francisco Bay Area Theater Critics Circle in 2009.

Fixing Paco, in which Garayua played the lead role of Margie Fuentes, was nominated for 2013 Best Webseries in the "Drama" Category. The show was also nominated in 2014 to the Best WebSeries in 3 categories, "Drama", "Comedy", and "Reality or Informational.

Other endeavors
Garayua has worked as a private acting coach in the Los Angeles area since 2005. She has also taught “Beginning and Intermediate Drama” at the Los Angeles Unified School District's “Gifted and Talented Fine Arts Conservatory", “Adult Beginner’s Scene Study” at “The Mauricio Ochmann Studio” in North Hollywood, “Advanced On-Camera Technique” at “Actor Training in LA” in North Hollywood, and “Teen Scene Study” at the “John D’Aquino’s Acting Studio” in Toluca Lake.

Garayua plays beginner piano, sings Mezzo-soprano, and is an intermediate dancer in Jazz and various Latin styles.

Filmography

Film

Television

References

External links
Official website

1978 births
Living people
Actresses from Los Angeles
Actresses from New York City
American actresses of Puerto Rican descent
American film actresses
American television actresses
American voice actresses
Long Island University alumni
People from the Bronx